The Durian bent-toed gecko (Cyrtodactylus durio) is a species of gecko that is endemic to peninsular Malaysia.

References 

Cyrtodactylus
Reptiles described in 2010